Rebelle Records AB is a record label founded by Björn Afzelius in 1988.  The name is a convergence of his two daughters' names Rebecca and Isabelle. The company, which holds the rights to all of Afzelius music is now located in Snekkersten, Denmark.

See also
 List of record labels

External links
Rebelle Records AB, official website

Danish record labels
Record labels established in 1988